Tholi Prema may refer to:

Tholi Prema (1998 film), an Indian film
Tholi Prema (2018 film), an Indian film